Zhu Dawei (born 25 July 1988 in Shanghai, China) is a Chinese baseball pitcher for the Saitama Seibu Lions. He was a member of the China national baseball team in the 2009 World Baseball Classic

External links

1988 births
2009 World Baseball Classic players
2013 World Baseball Classic players
Baseball players from Shanghai
Chinese baseball players
Chinese expatriate baseball players in Japan
Living people
Nippon Professional Baseball pitchers
Saitama Seibu Lions players
Seibu Lions players